Van Deusen is a surname of Dutch origin, sometimes spelled VanDeusen or Van Dursen. Notable people with the surname include:

Abraham Pietersen Van Deusen (before 1607–c. 1670), Dutch colonist in New Amsterdam
Carol Van Deusen, a partner of balloonist Larry Walters
Charles Van Deusen, a detective who was involved in the Omaha Race Riot of 1919
Katherine S. Van Deusen, wife of U.S. General William Westmoreland
Mary Westbrook Van Deusen (1829-1908), American author
J.B & J.D. Van Deusen Shipbuilding firm started by Joseph B. Van Deusen and James D. Van Deusen in 1865

See also
 Van Deusen's rat (Rattus vandeuseni) 

Surnames of Dutch origin